The Sultanate of Darfur was a pre-colonial state in present-day Sudan. It existed from 1603 to October 24, 1874, when it fell to the Sudanese warlord Rabih az-Zubayr and again from 1898 to 1916, when it was conquered by the British and integrated into Anglo-Egyptian Sudan. At its peak in the late 18th and early 19th century it stretched all the way from Darfur in the west to Kordofan and the western banks of the White Nile in the east, giving it the size of present-day Nigeria.

History

Origins

Darfur is composed mostly of semi-arid plains that cannot support a dense population. The one exception is the area in and around the Jebal Marra mountains.  It was from bases in these mountains that a series of groups expanded to control the region. The Daju and the 14th century migrants the Tunjur were the earliest powers in Darfur according to written records. The transition of power from the Daju to the Tunjur was facilitated through marriage.

Eventually the Tunjur began marrying amongst the Fur people producing Sultan Dali, a celebrated figure in Darfur histories, who was on his mother's side a Fur, and thus brought the dynasty closer to the people it ruled. Dali divided the country into provinces, and established a penal code, which, under the title of Kitab Dali or Dali's Book, is still preserved, and differs in some respects from Quranic law. His grandson Suleiman (or "Sulayman", usually distinguished by the Fur epithet Solon, meaning "the Arab" or "the Red") reigned from 1603 to 1637, and was a great warrior and a devoted Muslim. Suleiman Solon is considered as the founder of the Keira dynasty and the sultanate of Darfur. During the 17th century, the Keira sultans introduced the feudal hakura system into Darfur.

Soleiman's grandson, Ahmed Bukr (c.1682-c.1722), made Islam the religion of the state, and increased the prosperity of the country by encouraging immigration from Bornu and Bagirmi.

Civil War (1722–1786)

The death of Bukr initiated a long-running conflict over the succession. On his deathbed, Bukr stated that each of his many sons should rule in turn. Once on the throne, each of his sons instead hoped to make their own son heir, leading to an intermittent civil war that lasted until 1785/6 (AH 1200) Due to these internal divisions, Darfur declined in importance and engaged in wars with Sennar and Wadai.

Peak

One of the most capable of the monarchs during this period was Sultan Mohammed Terab, one of Ahmad Bukr's sons. He led a number of successful campaigns. In 1785-1786 (AH 1200), he led an army against the Funj, but got no further than Omdurman. Here he was stopped by the Nile, and found no means of getting his army across the river. Unwilling to give up his project, Terab remained at Omdurman for months and the army began to grow disaffected. According to some stories Terab was poisoned by his wife at the instigation of disaffected chiefs, and the army returned to Darfur. While he tried to have his son succeed him, the throne instead went to his brother Abd al-Rahman.

Sultan Abd-er-Rahman established a new capital at Al Fashir, meaning "the capital", in 1790. The capital had formerly been moved from place to place then at another location called Kobb. During his reign Abd-er-Rahman, surnamed el-Rashid or the Just, Napoleon Bonaparte was campaigning in Egypt. In 1799 Abd-er-Rahman wrote to congratulate the French general on his defeat of the Mamluks. Bonaparte replied by asking the sultan to send him by the next caravan 2000 black slaves upwards of sixteen years old, strong and vigorous.

Muhammad al-Fadl, his son, was for some time under the control of an energetic eunuch, Mohammed Kurra, but he ultimately made himself independent, and his reign lasted till 1838, when he died of leprosy. He devoted himself largely to the subjection of the semi-independent Arab tribes who lived in the country, notably the Rizeigat, thousands of whom he slew.

An account of life and the geography in Darfur was written in the early 19th century by Muḥammad al-Tūnisī (d. 1857)), who spent ten years as merchant from Cairo in the sultanate and described the kingdom in detail and with his own drawings in the book translated as In Darfur.

The Turkiyya (Ottoman rule)

In 1821, el-Fahl lost the province of Kordofan to the Egyptians under Mehemet Ali, who planned to conquer the Sudan. The Keira dispatched an army but it was routed by the Egyptians near Bara on 19 August 1821. The Egyptians had intended to conquer all of Darfur, but their difficulties consolidating their hold on the Nile region forced them to abandon these plans. Al-Fadl died in 1838 and of his forty sons, the third, Muhammad al-Husayn, was appointed his successor. Al-Husayn is described as a religious but avaricious man. In 1856 he went blind and for the rest of his reign Zamzam Umm al-Nasr, the sultan's eldest sister or ayabasi, was the de facto ruler of the sultanate. Zamzam and other members of the sultan's inner circle exploited his weakness to repossess and pillage large tracts of land, terrorizing the citizens and weakening the sultanate.

In 1856, a Khartoum businessman, al-Zubayr Rahma, began operations in the land south of Darfur. He set up a network of trading posts defended by well-armed forces and soon had a sprawling state under his rule. This area known as the Bahr el Ghazal had long been the source of the goods that Darfur would trade to Egypt and North Africa, especially slaves and ivory. The natives of Bahr el Ghazal paid tribute to Darfur, and these were the chief articles of merchandise sold by the Darfurians to the Egyptian traders along the road to Asyut. Al-Zubayr redirected this flow of goods to Khartoum and the Nile.

Sultan al-Husayn died in 1873 and the succession passed to his youngest son Ibrahim, who soon found himself engaged in a conflict with al-Zubayr. After earlier conflicts with the Egyptians, Al-Zubayr had become their ally and in cooperation with them agreed to conquer Darfur. The war resulted in the destruction of the kingdom. Ibrahim was slain in battle in the autumn of 1874, and his uncle Hassab Alla, who sought to maintain the independence of his country, was captured in 1875 by the troops of the khedive, and removed to Cairo with his family.

Ali Dinar

 

In 1898, with the decline of the Mahdists, sultan Ali Dinar managed to regain Darfur's independence. Darfur was conquered by the British Empire in 1916, officially because Dinar gave his support to the Ottoman Empire during the First World War. Dinar was killed and his kingdom was incorporated into the Anglo-Egyptian Condominium.

Warfare

The armies of Darfur underwent a three-staged evolution. Before the 18th century they consisted entirely of levy warbands, youths armed with spears, hide shields and occasionally throwing knives. They were commanded by an older man titled ornang or 'aqid. By the 18th century, a new type of warrior developed, the heavily armoured fursan. They would form the small core of the armies of Darfur. These fursan were armed with long swords imported from Solingen in Germany, lances, maces and sometimes firearms. Body armour consisted of locally made gambesons, German-made mail armour, silk coats, greaves and helmets. The horses were a Nubian breed imported from the Dongola Reach and were purchased with slaves. Like the riders they were armoured with gambesons and mail armour as well as additional armour for the head. All this equipment had to be organized and maintained by the chiefs responsible for the fursan. By the 1850s and 1860s, Darfur entered the third stage, when it attempted to build an army based on muskets. While firearms were already used in Darfur before it was only then when they were used tactically and in large numbers. These experiments were, however, ended with the invasion of al-Zubayr in 1874. Sultan Ibrahim died in a cavalry charge.

Sultans and notables were guarded by the korkwa, armed pages wielding spears and hide shields.

List of Rulers
Names and dates taken from John Stewart's African States and Rulers:

Sultans:
 Sulayman Solong (1603–1637)
 Musa ibn Suleiman (1637–1682)
 Ahmad Bakr ibn Musa (1682–1722)
 Muhammad I Dawra (1722–1732)
 Umar Lele (1732–1739)
 Abu'l Qasim (1739–1756)
 Muhammad II Tairab (1756–1787)
 Abdarrahman ar-Rashid (1787–1801)
 Muhammad III al-Fadhl (1801–1839)
 Muhammad IV Hussain (1839–1873)
 Ibrahim (1873–24 October 1874)

Position abolished in 1874 after Darfur becomes a province of the Anglo-Egyptian Sudan.

Governors of Darfur:
 Hassan Bey Hilmi (24 October 1874–1881)
 Rudolf Karl Slatin (1881–December 1883)

Position of Sultan re-established in 1899 following decline of the Mahdists.

Sultans:
 Ali Dinar ibn Zakariyya (21 March 1899–6 November 1916)

Position abolished in 1916 after Darfur again becomes a province of the Anglo-Egyptian Sudan.

Notes

References

Further reading

 

Former monarchies of Africa
Sahelian kingdoms
History of Sudan
Darfur
Lists of African monarchs
States and territories established in 1603
States and territories disestablished in 1874
States and territories established in 1898
States and territories disestablished in 1916
ja:ダルフール・スルターン国